Attribution is a term used in psychology which deals with how individuals perceive the causes of everyday experience, as being either external or internal. Models to explain this process are called attribution theory. Psychological research into attribution began with the work of Fritz Heider in the early 20th century, and the theory was further advanced by Harold Kelley and Bernard Weiner. Heider first introduced the concept of perceived 'locus of causality' to define the perception of one's environment. For instance, an experience may be perceived as being caused by factors outside the person's control (external) or it may be perceived as the person's own doing (internal). These initial perceptions are called attributions. Psychologists use these attributions to better understand an individual's motivation and competence. The theory is of particular interest to employers who use it to increase worker motivation, goal orientation, and productivity.

Psychologists have identified various biases in the way people attribute causation, especially when dealing with others. The fundamental attribution error describes the tendency to attribute dispositional or personality-based explanations for behavior, rather than considering external factors.  We tend to assume others are responsible for their own misfortunes, in other words, while blaming external factors for our own. Culture bias is when someone makes an assumption about the behavior of a person based on their own cultural practices and beliefs.

Attribution theory has been criticised as being mechanistic and reductionist for assuming that people are rational, logical, and systematic thinkers. It also fails to address the social, cultural, and historical factors that shape attributions of cause.

Background
Gestalt psychologist Fritz Heider is often described as the early-20th-century "father of attribution theory". In his 1920 dissertation, Heider addressed the problem of phenomenology: why do perceivers attribute the properties such as color to perceived objects, when those properties are mental constructs? Heider's answer that perceivers attribute that which they "directly" sense – vibrations in the air for instance – to an object they construe as causing those to sense data. "Perceivers faced with sensory data thus see the perceptual object as 'out there', because they attribute the sensory data to their underlying causes in the world." Heider extended this idea to attributions about people: "motives, intentions, sentiments ... the core processes which manifest themselves in overt behavior".

Key Theorists 
Fritz Heider

Fritz Heider’s most famous contribution to psychology began in the 1940’s when he began studying and accumulating knowledge on interpersonal behavior and social perception. These findings were compiled into his 1958 book “The Psychology of Interpersonal Relations” and Heider’s work became widely recognized as the best source of knowledge on Attribution Theory. In this book, Heider outlines two key goals that he planned to achieve in his studies. The first of which was to develop a scientific theory that was based on a “conceptual network suitable to some of the problems in this field.” This goal has been widely misinterpreted by theorists that attempted to follow in the footsteps of Heider, as many falsely assume that the core of human behavior is person-dichotomy rather than what Heider actually suggested in his book. Heider’s second goal was to redefine the understanding of “common-sense psychology” in order to develop his own scientific theory that explains social perception in humans. This second goal more clearly defined Heider’s theory on attribution. Through Heider’s research of attribution theory, he concerned himself with the reasons a person achieved success or failed. To organize the research, Heider broke the reasonings down into three different subjects, the first being ability, second being effort, and third being task difficulty. Heider saw both ability and effort being internal factors and task difficulty being an external factor.

Bernard Weiner

Bernard Weiner was not the originator of the theory; however, he expanded on this theory in several ways that helped to keep it relevant to today’s society and not fall into a demise that many theories from the 1900s found themselves in. The most influential aspect of Weiner’s work consists of the motivational aspect of attribution theory, which he introduced around the year 1968. This means that how one perceives past events and actions determines what actions a person will take in their future because the past experiences motivated them to do so. Weiner built his contribution of attribution theory off of other well-known theories such as Atkinsons’ theory of motivation, drive theory, and Thorndike’s Law of Effect which describes how rewarded behaviors will more than likely be repeated. Weiner argued that attribution theory is subjective in nature in that a person’s thoughts and feelings drive this theory; thus, researchers do not have to remain objective in their research and can explore the emotions, biases, motivations, and behaviors of their participants.

Perceived Locus of Causality

Heider first introduced the concept of perceived locus of causality using it to define interpersonal perception of one's environment. This theory explains how individuals perceive the causality of different events whether being external or internally based. These initial perceptions are called attributions. These attributions are viewed on a continuum of external to internal motivation. Understanding an individual's perception of causality also opens doors to a better understanding of how to better motivate an individual in specific tasks by increasing levels of autonomy, relatedness, and competence. The theory of perceived locus of causality lead to Deci and Ryan's theory of self-determination. Self-determination theory uses perceived locus of causality to measure feelings of autonomy from behaviors performed by the individual. For this reason perceived locus of causality has caught the eye of employers and psychologists to help determine how to increase an individuals motivation and goal orientation to increase effectiveness within their respective fields.  Research has shown that spectators at an athletic event often attribute their team's victory to internal causes and their team's losses to external causes. This is an example of self-serving attribution error or fundamental attribution error and is more common than one might think.

Types of attributions

External
External attribution, also called situational attribution, refers to interpreting someone's behavior as being caused by the individual's environment. For example, if one's car tire is punctured, it may be attributed to a hole in the road; by making attributions to the poor condition of the highway, one can make sense of the event without any discomfort that it may in reality have been the result of their own bad driving. Individuals are more likely to associate unfortunate events with external factors than with internal factors.

A person is using external attributions as a way to not use hearing aids. Examples of this are: A patient does not have the money to afford hearing aids so they do not purchase them. A person believes using hearing aids would make them a burden to people they are around, so they do not wear them. A person does not trust the doctor that is prescribing them hearing aids. Lastly, a person believes that other health conditions, either pertaining to themselves or someone else in their life, take priority over their need for hearing aids.

Internal
Internal attribution, or dispositional attribution, refers to the process of assigning the cause of behavior to some internal characteristic, likeability and motivation, rather than to outside forces. This concept has overlap with the Locus of control, in which individuals feel they are personally responsible for everything that happens to them.

A person is using internal attributions to justify not wearing their prescribed hearing aids. Examples of this are: A patient believes the hearing aids to not be necessary so they choose not to wear them. A patient is afraid of being stigmatized for having a disability and requiring hearing aids to hear properly, so they choose not to wear them. A patient is struggling with adding the usage of hearing aids into their everyday life and believes it to be easier to not wear them at all. Lastly, a patient does not fully understand the benefits that hearing aids will grant them, so they choose not to wear them despite the benefits hearing aids would grant them.

Theories and models

Common sense psychology
From the book The Psychology of Interpersonal Relations (1958), Fritz Heider tried to explore the nature of interpersonal relationship, and espoused the concept of what he called "common sense" or "naïve psychology". In his theory, he believed that people observe, analyze, and explain behaviors with explanations. Although people have different kinds of explanations for the events of human behaviors, Heider found it is very useful to group explanation into two categories; Internal (personal) and external (situational) attributions. When an internal attribution is made, the cause of the given behavior is assigned to the individual's characteristics such as ability, personality, mood, efforts, attitudes, or disposition. When an external attribution is made, the cause of the given behavior is assigned to the situation in which the behavior was seen such as the task, other people, or luck (that the individual producing the behavior did so because of the surrounding environment or the social situation). These two types lead to very different perceptions of the individual engaging in a behavior.

Correspondent inference

Correspondent inferences state that people make inferences about a person when their actions are freely chosen, are unexpected, and result in a small number of desirable effects. According to Edward E. Jones and Keith Davis' correspondent inference theory, people make correspondent inferences by reviewing the context of behavior. It describes how people try to find out an individual's personal characteristics from the behavioral evidence. People make inferences on the basis of three factors; degree of choice, expectedness of behavior, and effects of someone's behaviors. For example, we believe we can make stronger assumptions about a man who gives half of his money to charity, than we can about one who gives $5 to charity. An average person would not want to donate as much as the first man because they would lose a lot of money. By donating half of his money, it is easier for someone to figure out what the first man's personality is like. The second factor, that affects correspondence of action and inferred characteristic, is the number of differences between the choices made and the previous alternatives. If there aren't many differences, the assumption made will match the action because it is easy to guess the important aspect between each choice.

Covariation model

The covariation model states that people attribute behavior to the factors that are present when a behavior occurs and absent when it does not. Thus, the theory assumes that people make causal attributions in a rational, logical fashion, and that they assign the cause of an action to the factor that co-varies most closely with that action. Harold Kelley's covariation model of attribution looks to three main types of information from which to make an attribution decision about an individual's behavior. The first is consensus information, or information on how other people in the same situation and with the same stimulus behave. The second is distinctive information, or how the individual responds to different stimuli. The third is consistency information, or how frequent the individual's behavior can be observed with similar stimulus but varied situations. From these three sources of affirmation observers make attribution decisions on the individual's behavior as either internal or external. There have been claims that people under-utilise consensus information, although there has been some dispute over this.

There are several levels in the covariation model: high and low. Each of these levels influences the three covariation model criteria. High consensus is when many people can agree on an event or area of interest. Low consensus is when very few people can agree. High distinctiveness is when the event or area of interest is very unusual, whereas low distinctness is when the event or area of interest is fairly common. High consistency is when the event or area of interest continues for a length of time and low consistency is when the event or area of interest goes away quickly.

Three-dimensional model
Bernard Weiner proposed that individuals have initial affective responses to the potential consequences of the intrinsic or extrinsic motives of the actor, which in turn influence future behavior. That is, a person's own perceptions or attributions as to why they succeeded or failed at an activity determine the amount of effort the person will engage in activities in the future. Weiner suggests that individuals exert their attribution search and cognitively evaluate casual properties on the behaviors they experience. When attributions lead to positive affect and high expectancy of future success, such attributions should result in greater willingness to approach to similar achievement tasks in the future than those attributions that produce negative affect and low expectancy of future success. Eventually, such affective and cognitive assessment influences future behavior when individuals encounter similar situations.

Weiner's achievement attribution has three categories:
 stable theory (stable and unstable)
 locus of control (internal and external)
 controllability (controllable or uncontrollable)

Stability influences individuals' expectancy about their future; control is related with individuals' persistence on mission; causality influences emotional responses to the outcome of task.

Bias and errors

While people strive to find reasons for behaviors, they fall into many traps of biases and errors. As Fritz Heider says, "our perceptions of causality are often distorted by our needs and certain cognitive biases". The following are examples of attributional biases.

Fundamental attribution error

The fundamental attribution error describes the habit to misunderstand dispositional or personality-based explanations for behavior, rather than considering external factors. The fundamental attribution error is most visible when people explain and assume the behavior of others. For example, if a person is overweight, a person's first assumption might be that they have a problem with overeating or are lazy, and not that they might have a medical reason for being heavier set.

When evaluating others' behaviors, the situational context is often ignored in favor of assuming the disposition of the actor to be the cause of an observed behavior. This is because, when a behavior occurs, attention is most often focused on the person performing the behavior.  Thus the individual is more salient than the environment, and dispositional attributions are made more often than situational attributions to explain the behavior of others.

However, when evaluating one's own behavior, the situational factors are often exaggerated when there is a negative outcome, while dispositional factors are exaggerated when there is a positive outcome.

The core process assumptions of attitude construction models are mainstays of social cognition research and are not controversial—as long as we talk about "judgment". Once the particular judgment made can be thought of as a person's "attitude", however, construal assumptions elicit discomfort, presumably because they dispense with the intuitively appealing attitude concept.

Sociocultural disparities are a main source for the propensity of the fundamental attribution error caused by an augment of inferring dispositional attribution while ignoring situational attribution.

Culture bias

Culture bias is when someone makes an assumption about the behavior of a person based on their own cultural practices and beliefs. An example of culture bias is the dichotomy of "individualistic" and "collectivistic cultures". People in individualist cultures,  generally Anglo-America and Anglo-Saxon European, are characterized as societies which value individualism, personal goals, and independence. People in collectivist cultures are thought to regard individuals as members of groups such as families, tribes, work units, and nations, and tend to value conformity and interdependence. In other words, working together and being involved as a group is more common in certain cultures that view each person as a part of the community. This cultural trait is common in Asia, traditional Native American societies, and Africa. Research shows that culture, either individualist or collectivist, affects how people make attributions.

People from individualist cultures are more inclined to make fundamental-attribution error than people from collectivist cultures. Individualist cultures tend to attribute a person's behavior due to their internal factors whereas collectivist cultures tend to attribute a person's behavior to his external factors.

Research suggests that individualist cultures engage in self-serving bias more than do collectivist cultures, i.e. individualist cultures tend to attribute success to internal factors and to attribute failure to external factors. In contrast, collectivist cultures engage in the opposite of self-serving bias i.e. self-effacing bias, which is: attributing success to external factors and blaming failure on internal factors (the individual).

Further research suggests that in the United States in particular, culture bias implies a hyperbolized function of culture within the social environments dominated by minorities. These research findings are further supported by aggravation of the perception that there is less of a role in the presence of psychological development of minorities as opposed to their Caucasian counterparts.

Actor/observer difference
People tend to attribute other people's behaviors to their dispositional factors while attributing their own actions to situational factors. In the same situation, people's attribution can differ depending on their role as actor or observer. For example, when a person scores a low grade on a test, they find situational factors to justify the negative event such as saying that the teacher asked a question that he/she never went over in class. However, if another person scores poorly on a test, the person will attribute the results to internal factors such as laziness and inattentiveness in classes. The theory of the actor-observer bias was first developed by E. Jones and R. Nisbett  in 1971, whose explanation for the effect was that when we observe other people, we tend to focus on the person, whereas when we are actors, our attention is focused towards situational factors. The actor/observer bias is used less frequently with people one knows well such as friends and family since one knows how his/her close friends and family will behave in certain situation, leading him/her to think more about the external factors rather than internal factors.

Dispositional attributions

Dispositional attribution is a tendency to attribute people's behaviors to their dispositions; that is, to their personality, character, and ability.
For example, when a normally pleasant waiter is being rude to his/her customer, the customer may assume he/she has a bad character. The customer, just by looking at the attitude that the waiter is giving him/her, instantly decides that the waiter is a bad person. The customer oversimplifies the situation by not taking into account all the unfortunate events that might have happened to the waiter which made him/her become rude at that moment. Therefore, the customer made dispositional attribution by attributing the waiter's behavior directly to his/her personality rather than considering situational factors that might have caused the whole "rudeness".

The degree of dispositional attribution varies greatly within people. As seen within culture bias, dispositional attribution is impacted by personal beliefs and individual perspectives. Research has shown that dispositional attribution can be influenced by explicit inferences (i.e. instructions or information provided to an individual) that can essentially "guide" a person's judgement.

Self-serving bias

Self-serving bias is attributing dispositional and internal factors for success, while external and uncontrollable factors are used to explain the reason for failure. For example, if a person gets promoted, it is because of his/her ability and competence whereas if he/she does not get promoted, it is because his/her manager does not like him/her (external, uncontrollable factor). Originally, researchers assumed that self-serving bias is strongly related to the fact that people want to protect their self-esteem.  However, an alternative information processing explanation is that when the outcomes match people's expectations, they make attributions to internal factors; for example, someone who passes a test might believe it was because of their intelligence. Whereas when the outcome does not match their expectations, they make external attributions or excuses; the same person might excuse failing a test by saying that they did not have enough time to study. People also use defensive attribution to avoid feelings of vulnerability and to differentiate themselves from a victim of a tragic accident.  An alternative version of the theory of self-serving bias states that the bias does not arise because people wish to protect their private self-esteem, but to protect their self-image (a self-presentational bias). This version of the theory, which is in line with social desirability bias, would predict that people attribute their successes to situational factors, for fear that others will disapprove of them looking overly vain if they should attribute successes to themselves.

For example, the just-world hypothesis states that coming to believe that "good things happen to good people and bad things happen to bad people" will reduce feelings of vulnerability. This belief would have side-effects of blaming the victim even in tragic situations. When a mudslide destroys several houses in a rural neighborhood, a person living in a more urban setting might blame the victims for choosing to live in a certain area or not building a safer, stronger house. Another example of attributional bias is optimism bias in which most people believe positive events happen to them more often than to others and that negative events happen to them less often than to others. For example, smokers on average believe they are less likely to get lung cancer than other smokers.

Defensive attribution hypothesis

The defensive attribution hypothesis is a social psychological term referring to a set of beliefs held by an individual with the function of defending themselves from concern that they will be the cause or victim of a mishap. Commonly, defensive attributions are made when individuals witness or learn of a mishap happening to another person.  In these situations, attributions of responsibility to the victim or harm-doer for the mishap will depend upon the severity of the outcomes of the mishap and the level of personal and situational similarity between the individual and victim.  More responsibility will be attributed to the harm-doer as the outcome becomes more severe, and as personal or situational similarity decreases.

An example of defensive attribution is the just-world hypothesis, which is where "good things happen to good people and bad things happen to bad people". People believe in this in order to avoid feeling vulnerable to situations that they have no control over. However, this also leads to blaming the victim even in a tragic situation. When people hear someone died from a car accident, they decide that the driver was drunk at the time of the accident, and so they reassure themselves that an accident will never happen to them. Despite the fact there was no other information provided, people will automatically attribute that the accident was the driver's fault due to an internal factor (in this case, deciding to drive while drunk), and thus they would not allow it to happen to themselves.

Another example of defensive attribution is optimism bias, in which people believe positive events happen to them more often than to others and that negative events happen to them less often than to others. Too much optimism leads people to ignore some warnings and precautions given to them. For example, smokers believe that they are less likely to get lung cancer than other smokers.

Cognitive Dissonance Theory
Cognitive dissonance theory refers to a situation involving conflicting attitudes, beliefs or behaviors that cause arousal within the individual. The arousal often produces a feeling of mental or even physical discomfort either leading the individual to alter their own attitudes, beliefs, or behaviors or attributions of the situation. It is much harder for a person to change their behaviors or beliefs than it is to change how they perceive a situation. For example, if someone perceives themselves as being very capable in a sport but perform poorly during a game they are more likely to attribute or blame the poor performance on an external factor than on internal factors such as their skill and ability. This is done in an effort to preserve their current held believes and perceptions about them selves. Otherwise they are left to face the thought that they are not as good at the sport as they originally thought causing a feeling of dissonance and arousal.

Application

Attribution theory can be applied to juror decision making. Jurors use attributions to explain the cause of the defendant's intent and actions related to the criminal behavior.  The attribution made (situational or dispositional) might affect a juror's punitiveness towards the defendant. When jurors attribute a defendant's behavior to dispositional attributions they tend to be more punitive and are more likely find a defendant guilty and to recommend a death sentence compared to a life sentence.

In Marketing Communication
The Attribution theories have been used as a tool to analyze causal attributions made by consumers and its effectiveness in marketing communication. Attribution theory has also been utilized to examine external and internal factors of corporate social responsibility (CSR), and the affects the different social movements corporations endorsed have on consumers and their emotions.

In clinical psychology

Attribution theory has had a big application in clinical psychology. Abramson, Seligman, and Teasdale developed a theory of the depressive attributional style, claiming that individuals who tend to attribute their failures to internal, stable and global factors are more vulnerable to clinical depression. This style is correlated with self-reported rates of depression, as well as posttraumatic stress disorder, anxiety, and higher risks of developing depression. The Depressive attributional style is defined by high levels of pessimism, rumination, hopelessness, self-criticism, poorer academic performance, and a tendency to believe negative outcomes and events are one's own fault. People with this attributional style may place high levels of importance on their own reputation and social status. They may be sensitive to rejection by peers and may often interpret actions as more hostile then they really are. Some research has suggested that this attributional style may not result an increased levels of depression amongst certain cultures. A study conducted by researchers at Tsinghua University found that this style was common amongst Buddhists due to cultural beliefs in ideas such as Karma yet they did not demonstrate increased levels of depression. This explanatory style may be caused by depressive symptoms in the patient's parents.

The Attributional Style Questionnaire (ASQ) was developed back in 1996 to assess whether individuals have the depressogenic attributional style. However, the ASQ has been criticized, with some researchers preferring to use a technique called Content Analysis of Verbatim Explanation (CAVE) in which an individual's ordinary writings are analyzed to assess whether s/he is vulnerable to the depressive attributional style. The key advantage of using content analysis is its non-invasive nature, in contrast to collecting survey answers or simulating social experiences.

In sport and exercise

Attribution theory has been applied to a variety of sports and exercise contexts, such as, children's motivation for physical activity and African soccer where attributions are placed toward magic and rituals, such as what magician is consulted before the game begins, rather than the technical and mechanical aspects of playing football.

In education

Attribution theory has been used to research motivation in such educational contexts such as mathematics The way in which teachers attribute behavior can impact their response to problematic children.

Learned helplessness

The concept of learned helplessness emerged from animal research in which psychologists Martin Seligman and Steven F. Maier discovered that dogs classically conditioned to an electrical shock which they could not escape, subsequently failed to attempt to escape an avoidable shock in a similar situation. They argued that learned helplessness applied to human psychopathology. In particular, individuals who attribute negative outcomes to internal, stable and global factors reflect a view in which they have no control over their situation. It is suggested that this aspect of not attempting to better a situation exacerbates negative mood, and may lead to clinical depression and related mental illnesses.

Perceptual salience

When people try to make attributions about another's behavior, their information focuses on the individual. Their perception of that individual is lacking most of the external factors which might affect the individual. The gaps tend to be skipped over and the attribution is made based on the perception information most salient. The most salient perceptual information dominates a person's perception of the situation.

For individuals making behavioral attributions about themselves, the situation and external environment are entirely salient, but their own body and behavior are less so. This leads to the tendency to make an external attribution in regard to their own behavior.

COVID-19 Pandemic 
The onset of the COVID-19 pandemic furthered studies relating to attribution theory. A study conducted by Elvin Yao and Jason Siegel looked further into Weiner’s definition of attribution theory and how people express emotions when the intentional spreading of COVID occurs. The researchers also included a controllability factor that played a part in the perceived intentionality. The results of the study demonstrated high levels of anger and frustration among people who perceived that someone was intentionally spreading COVID-19. These high levels of frustration also led to a desire to punish the person intentionally spreading the virus, especially when the spreader was in full control of their circumstances and knowledge of their actions. Furthermore, whether or not a “spreader” had control of the factors surrounding the spreading of the virus, as long as the person had a high perceived intentionality then other people responded with anger. This study exemplifies how when the intentions of a person are perceived to be negative to society as a whole, then people respond negatively as well, mostly out of frustration.

Criticism
Attribution theory has been criticized as being mechanistic and reductionist for assuming that people are rational, logical, and systematic thinkers. The fundamental attribution error, however, demonstrates that they are cognitive misers and motivated tacticians. It also fails to address the social, cultural, and historical factors that shape attributions of cause. This has been addressed extensively by discourse analysis, a branch of psychology that prefers to use qualitative methods including the use of language to understand psychological phenomena. The linguistic categorization theory for example demonstrates how language influences our attribution style.

See also

 
 
 
 
 
 Religious attribution

References

Further reading

 

Interpersonal communication
Psychological theories
Cognitive biases